Søren Rasmussen (born 12 August 1976) is a Danish handballer, currently playing for Bjerringbro-Silkeborg in the Danish Handball League. He won the 2013–14 EHF Champions League with SG Flensburg-Handewitt.

Honours
Danish Championship:
: 2016

External links
Player Profile
Explanation of name spelling 

1976 births
Living people
Danish male handball players
People from Skive Municipality
Sportspeople from the Central Denmark Region